Samitha Ranga (born 14 April 1998) is a Sri Lankan cricketer. He made his first-class debut on 11 January 2019, for Nondescripts Cricket Club in the 2018–19 Premier League Tournament. He made his List A debut on 14 December 2019, for Sri Lanka Navy Sports Club in the 2019–20 Invitation Limited Over Tournament. He made his Twenty20 debut on 4 January 2020, for Sri Lanka Navy Sports Club in the 2019–20 SLC Twenty20 Tournament.

References

External links
 

1998 births
Living people
Sri Lankan cricketers
Nondescripts Cricket Club cricketers
Sri Lanka Navy Sports Club cricketers
Cricketers from Colombo